A list of films produced in South Korea in 1972:

External links

1972 in South Korea
 1970-1979 at www.koreanfilm.org

1972
South Korean
1972 in South Korea